Four ships of the Royal Navy have borne the name HMS Attentive, as have two shore establishments:

 was an Archer-class gunbrig of 12 guns, launched in 1804 and broken up in 1812.
Attentive served as a store ship until she was broken up in Britain in 1817.
 was an  scout cruiser of the Royal Navy launched in 1904 and sold for scrapping in 1920.
HMS Attentive II was the shore base for the Dover Patrol, and was established in 1914 and decommissioned 31 October 1919. 
 was a tender transferred from the War Department in 1905. She was renamed HMS Attentive in 1919, and was sold in 1923.
HMS Attentive was a shore base established 1 September 1939 as the command base for Portland.

Royal Navy ship names